The 1994 Moscow Ladies Open was a women's tennis tournament played on indoor carpet courts at the Olympic Stadium in Moscow, Russia, that was part of Tier III of the 1994 WTA Tour.

It was held from September 19 through 24, 1994.

It was the fourth edition of the WTA tournament inaugurated under the title of Virginia Slims of Moscow in 1989.

Finals

Singles 
 Magdalena Maleeva defeated  Sandra Cecchini 7–5, 6–1
 It was Maleeva's 1st WTA singles title of the year and the 2nd of her career.

Doubles 
 Elena Makarova /  Eugenia Maniokova defeated  Laura Golarsa /  Caroline Vis 7-6(6–3), 6-4
 It was Makarova's only doubles WTA title of her career. It was Maniokova's 2nd WTA doubles title of the year and the 4th and last of her career.

References

External links 
 

Moscow Ladies Open
Moscow Ladies Open
1994 in Russian women's sport
September 1994 sports events in Russia
1994 in Russian tennis